Pierre Hardy (4 August 1907 – 24 July 2000) was a French sport shooter. He was born in Paris. He competed at the 1924 Summer Olympics, where he won a silver medal in the team contest.

References

External links

1907 births
2000 deaths
French male sport shooters
Olympic shooters of France
Olympic silver medalists for France
Shooters at the 1924 Summer Olympics
Olympic medalists in shooting
Sport shooters from Paris
Medalists at the 1924 Summer Olympics
20th-century French people